The Norwegian Youth Cup is an annual football knockout tournament involving Norwegian youth teams, with a maximum age of 19, that was first arranged in 1953.

List of finals

Performance by club

References
Norwegian Youth Cup at RSSSF.no

External links
Norwegian Youth Cup at fotball.no

Youth Cup
Norway
1953 establishments in Norway
Recurring sporting events established in 1953